Itaju is a municipality in the state of São Paulo in Brazil. The population is 3,887 (2020 est.) in an area of 230 km². The elevation is 498 m.

References

Municipalities in São Paulo (state)